|}

The Finale Stakes is a Listed flat horse race in Ireland open to thoroughbreds aged three years or older. It is run at Naas Racecourse over a distance of 1 mile 3 furlongs and 180 yards (2,377 metres), and it is scheduled to take place each year in late November. The 2016 race was run as the Brown Panther Stakes. 

The Finale Stakes was first run in 2001. It takes place at Ireland's final flat turf meeting of the season and prior to 2017 it was run at the Curragh over 1 mile 4 furlongs in October. It was transferred to Naas when the Curragh was closed for redevelopment and continued to be run at Naas in November after the Curragh re-opened.

Records
Leading jockey (6 wins):
 Pat Smullen – 	Diamond Trim (2001), Silverhand (2009), Sapphire (2011), Variable (2015), Alveena (2016), Tocco D'Amore (2017) 

Leading trainer (6 wins):
 Dermot Weld – Diamond Trim (2001), Sapphire (2011), Variable (2015), Alveena (2016), Tocco D'Amore (2017), Duke De Sessa (2022)

Winners

See also
 Horse racing in Ireland
 List of Irish flat horse races

References
Racing Post:
, 

Flat races in Ireland
Open middle distance horse races
Curragh Racecourse
Recurring sporting events established in 2001
2001 establishments in Ireland